Dale Howard Lastman  (born 19 March 1957) is a Canadian lawyer who serves as Chair of Goodmans law firm. He is the elder son of the late Mel Lastman, who was Mayor of Toronto from 1998 to 2003.

Career and community involvement
Dale practices corporate, commercial and securities law with Goodmans. He serves as a Director of Maple Leaf Sports & Entertainment and serves as an Alternate Governor for both the NHL and the NBA. From 2019-2022, Dale served as Chair of the Board of Governors of the CFL and currently serves as the Governor representing the Toronto Argonauts. Dale is actively involved in community and charitable organizations and is a Director and former Chair of Baycrest Health Sciences Baycrest. and a Honorary Trustee of the Hospital for Sick Children (Toronto).  He has extensive experience on corporate boards, and currently sits on the Board of Directors of RioCan Real Estate Investment Trust and Roots Corporation.

Dale is a Member of the Order of Canada and the Order of Ontario. In 2014, Dale was appointed by the Minister of National Defence as an Honorary Captain of the Royal Canadian Navy. He has also been awarded the rank of an Honorary Detective by the Toronto Police Service and an Honorary Big by Big Brothers Big Sisters of Toronto. Dale has been recognized among "Toronto's 50 Most Influential People" by Toronto Life Magazine. . He was honoured as one of the ICRF's 2010 "Men of Distinction" for his philanthropic efforts and contributions to the community and in 2011 and 2012, was presented with the ICRF's Chairman's Award. Dale is a recipient of Canada's "Top 40 Under 40" and its "Best of the Best" Canadian Leadership Award.

Dale is recognized as an Eminent Practitioner by Chambers Global (corporate/M&A), and is recommended as a leading practitioner by The Legal 500 Canada, The Canadian Legal Lexpert Directory (corporate/M&A), Euromoney’s Guide to the World’s Leading M&A Lawyers, Who’s Who Legal (M&A and Sports), The Lexpert/ALM Guide to the Leading 500 Lawyers in Canada (corporate finance), Best Lawyers in Canada (Corporate / M&A / Securities / Corporate Governance Practice) and as its 2023 “Lawyer of the Year” in Sports Law. Dale has also been recognized as the Canadian Lawyer of the Year in M&A and Sports and Entertainment Lawyer of the Year by the Finance Monthly Law Awards and is currently recognized by Corporate Law Experts as its exclusively recommended lawyer in Canada. 

For over 30 years, Dale was one of Osgoode Hall Law School's longest serving lecturers in securities law. During his tenure, he received the Adjunct Faculty Award for Teaching Excellence as well as the Alumni Gold Key award for outstanding professional achievement and contribution to the legal community.

References

1957 births
Living people
Lawyers in Ontario
Canadian legal scholars
University of Toronto alumni
Osgoode Hall Law School alumni
Canadian chief executives
Maple Leaf Sports & Entertainment